The 1937–38 Football League season was Birmingham Football Club's 42nd in the Football League and their 25th in the First Division. They finished in 18th position in the 22-team division, only two points clear of the relegation places. They entered the 1937–38 FA Cup at the third round proper and lost to Blackpool in that round.

Twenty-four players made at least one appearance in nationally organised competition, and there were thirteen different goalscorers. Half-back Norman Brunskill played in 37 of the 43 matches over the season, and full-back Cyril Trigg, half-back Dai Richards, and forwards Don Dearson and Frank White played in 36. Dearson and Charlie Wilson Jones were joint leading scorers with nine goals, all scored in the league. This was the last season under the chairmanship of Howard Cant, who first took office in 1911. He was succeeded by Harry Morris, son of the former player and director, also called Harry Morris.

Football League First Division

League table (part)

FA Cup

Appearances and goals

Players with name struck through and marked  left the club during the playing season.

See also
Birmingham City F.C. seasons

References
General
 
 
 Source for match dates and results: 
 Source for lineups, appearances, goalscorers and attendances: Matthews (2010), Complete Record, pp. 316–17.
 Source for kit: "Birmingham City". Historical Football Kits. Retrieved 22 May 2018.

Specific

Birmingham City F.C. seasons
Birmingham